Tessa Simpson (born October 27, 1986) is an American former mixed martial artist who competed in Atomweight division of the Invicta Fighting Championships (Invicta).

Background 
Simpson was born in Guam. Growing up as a teenager, she was actively competing in various sports.  She started training in jiu-jitsu after watching Pride Fighting Championships and Pancrase events. She took up Muay Thai later and transitioned to mixed martial arts as few kickboxing competition events could be found in Texas.

Mixed martial arts career

Early career 
Simpson started her amateur career in 2009. After amassing 2–1 record in 2009, she had a long hiatus from 2010 to 2016 where she had only one fight in 2013. She was signed by Invicta Fighting Championships (Invicta) after coming nearly a three-year layoff when she won over Satomi Takano at Pacific Xtreme Combat 52 with amassing a record of 4–1.

Invicta Fighting Championships 
Simpson made her promotional debut on July 29, 2016, at Invicta FC 18: Grasso vs. Esquibel against Simona Soukupova. She won the fight unanimous decision.

Her next fight came ten months later on May 20, 2017, at Invicta FC 23: Porto vs. Niedzwiedz against Herica Tiburcio. She lost the fight  via split decision.

On December 8, 2017, Simpson faced Amber Brown at Invicta FC 26: Maia vs. Niedzwiedz. She won the fight via a submission armbar  on round one.

Mixed martial arts record 

|-
| Loss
| align=center| 5–3
| Amber Brown
| Submission (armbar)
| Invicta FC 26: Maia vs. Niedzwiedz
| 
| align=center| 1
| align=center| 0:50
| Kansas City, Missouri, United States
|
|-
| Loss
| align=center| 5–2
| Herica Tiburcio
| Decision (split)
| Invicta FC 23: Porto vs. Niedzwiedz
| 
| align=center| 3
| align=center| 5:00
| Kansas City, Missouri, United States
|
|-
| Win
| align=center| 5–1
| Simona Soukupova
| Decision (unanimous)
| Invicta FC 18: Grasso vs. Esquibel
| 
| align=center| 3
| align=center| 5:00
| Kansas City, Missouri, United States
|-
| Win
| align=center| 4–1
| Satomi Takano
| Submission (mounted triangle keylock)
| Pacific Xtreme Combat 52
| 
| align=center| 3
| align=center|2:01
| Mangilao, Guam, Guam
|-
| Win
| align=center| 3–1
| Paulina Granados
| Decision (unanimous)
| Legacy Fighting Championship 23
| 
| align=center| 3
| align=center| 5:00
| San Antonio, Texas, United States
|-
| Loss
| align=center| 2–1
| Anita Rodriguez
| Submission (scarf hold armlock)
| Bully Bash and Brawl 2
| 
| align=center| 2
| align=center|0:56
| Austin, Texas, United States
|-
| Win
| align=center| 2–0
| Hayley Cypert
| TKO (punches)
| Adrenaline: Feel The Rush
| 
| align=center| 1
| align=center|1:56
| San Angelo, Texas, United States
|-
| Win
| align=center| 1–0
| Angelita Davis
| Submission (triangle choke)
| Shark Fights 3
| 
| align=center| 1
| align=center|0:48
| Amarillo, Texas, United States
|-

See also 
 List of current Invicta FC fighters
 List of female mixed martial artists

References

External links 
 
 Tessa Simpson at Invicta FC

1986 births
Living people
American female mixed martial artists
American Muay Thai practitioners
Female Muay Thai practitioners
American practitioners of Brazilian jiu-jitsu
Female Brazilian jiu-jitsu practitioners
Atomweight mixed martial artists
Mixed martial artists utilizing Muay Thai
Mixed martial artists utilizing Brazilian jiu-jitsu
21st-century American women